The 2016 Lindenwood Lions football team represented Lindenwood University in the 2016 NCAA Division II football season. The Lions played their home games at Harlen C. Hunter Stadium in St. Charles, Missouri, as they have done since 1990. 2016 was the 27th season in school history. The Lions were led by thirteenth-year head coach, Patrick Ross. Lindenwood has been a member of the Mid-America Intercollegiate Athletics Association since 2012.

Preseason
The Lions entered the 2016 season after a 3–8 record in 2015 under Ross. On August 2, 2016 at the MIAA Football Media Day, the Lions were chosen to finish in 11th place in the Coaches Poll, and 9th in the Media Poll.

Postseason
After another losing season and no success in the NCAA Division II since 2012, Ross was relieved of his duties on November 15, 2016. He was 93–57 at Lindenwood.

Personnel

Coaching staff
Along with Ross, there were 8 assistants.

Schedule

Source:

Game summaries

Central Oklahoma

Northeastern State

Washburn

Pittsburg State

Fort Hays State

Missouri Western

Emporia State

Northwest Missouri State

Nebraska–Kearney

Missouri Southern

Central Missouri

References

Lindenwood
Lindenwood Lions football seasons
Lindenwood Lions football